It's Not Easy Being Green is a television series on BBC Two starring Dick Strawbridge and focusing on how to live an environmentally friendly, low impact life. Three series were produced.

Series one followed Strawbridge, his wife Brigit, son James, and daughter Charlotte as they moved into Newhouse Farm, a 400-year-old listed building in Tywardreath, Cornwall, from Malvern, Worcestershire. The series documented the family's attempts to convert the building and garden into a comfortable yet entirely ecologically friendly place to live. Dick Strawbridge said: "I don't want to wear a hemp shirt and hairy knickers, I want a 21st-century lifestyle with a coffee machine."

In the first series, the family received advice from permaculture expert Patrick Whitefield and green auditor Donnachadh McCarthy. They were also helped by friends Jim Milner and Anda Phillips as well as at points a small army of friends and relatives.  A book entitled It's Not Easy Being Green: One Family's Journey Towards Eco-Friendly Living by Dick Strawbridge was released to accompany the series.

Series two mostly focused on the Strawbridges helping others to achieve their eco-friendly goals, rather than on their own residence. Series three, broadcast in 2009, took on more of a "magazine" format, incorporating various regular features including the series-long renovation of a townhouse using "green" materials and techniques and interviews with celebrities about how ecologically friendly (or otherwise) their own lifestyles are. Lauren Laverne appeared as a regular reporter in the third season, and James Strawbridge also had a larger role as co-presenter.

Newhouse Farm
Newhouse Farm was the home of Dick Strawbridge and his son James, and was where much of the filming for all three series of It's Not Easy Being Green occurred. The Strawbridges ran eco courses at the farm that included information about making biodiesel, harnessing wind power, using water power, and eco-engineering.

Series 1 (2006)

Series 2 (2007)

Series 3 (2009)

See also
Dick Strawbridge

References

Bibliography

External links
 
 

2006 British television series debuts
2006 British television series endings
BBC Television shows
Environmental television